Paraccra mimesa is a species of moth of the family Tortricidae. It is found in Kenya and Tanzania.

The wingspan is about 14 mm. The ground colour of the forewings is bluish grey, the costa and proximal half of the termen edged with yellowish ochreous marked with blackish spots and grey dots respectively. The ochreous orange fascia from two-thirds of the costa to the end of the termen is marked red inside. The hindwings are brown.

The larvae feed on the fruit of Agelaea pentagyna and Rourea thomsoni.

References

Moths described in 2005
Tortricini
Moths of Africa
Taxa named by Józef Razowski